Lewis Mountain, also known as Onteora, is a historic home located near Charlottesville, Albemarle County, Virginia. It was designed in 1909, and completed in 1912. The house is a three-part plan granite dwelling, consisting of a nearly square center section flanked by one-story, flat-roofed wings in the Colonial Revival style.  It features a massive wooden cornice employing a simplified version of the Roman Doric order of Vignola, a deck-on-hip roof with pedimented dormers at its base, and a portico with four Doric order columns.  It also has a one-story, tetrastyle Tuscan portico that serves as a
porte cochere.  The steeply sloped property features a landscape designed by Warren H. Manning with a series of three terraces with tall dry-laid stone retaining walls.

It was added to the National Register of Historic Places in 2009.

References

Houses on the National Register of Historic Places in Virginia
Colonial Revival architecture in Virginia
Houses completed in 1912
Houses in Albemarle County, Virginia
National Register of Historic Places in Albemarle County, Virginia
1912 establishments in Virginia